Konso (Komso, Khonso, also Af Kareti, Afa Karatti, Conso, Gato, Karate, Kareti) is a Lowland East Cushitic language spoken in southwest Ethiopia. Native speakers of Konso number about 200,000 (SIL 2005).  Konso is closely related to Dirasha (also known as Gidole), and serves as a "trade language"—or lingua franca—beyond the area of the Konso people. Blench (2006) considers purported dialects Gato and Turo to be separate languages.

The Grammar of Konso was first described by Hellenthal (2004), and later, in more detail, by Ongaye (2013). The New Testament was published in the Konso language in 2002.

Phonology

Consonants 
Unlike its Oromoid relatives and most East African languages in general, Konso distinguishes neither voiced nor ejective consonants. Instead, it has a series of implosive stops, including the extremely rare uvular implosive /ʛ/.

Vowels 
Typically of a Cushitic language, Konso distinguishes five short and five long vowels:

See also 
Konso

References

Literature on the Konso language 
 
 
 
Uusitalo, Mirjami (2007). Konso language. in Siegbert Uhlig (ed.), Encyclopaedia Aethiopica 3, 424-425. Wiesbaden: Harrassowitz Verlag.

Languages of Ethiopia
East Cushitic languages